The 1986–87 season was the 76th season in Hajduk Split’s history and their 41st in the Yugoslav First League. Their 4th place finish in the 1985–86 season meant it was their 41st successive season playing in the Yugoslav First League.

Competitions

Overall

Yugoslav First League

Classification

Results summary

Results by round

Matches

Yugoslav First League

Sources: hajduk.hr

Yugoslav Cup

Sources: hajduk.hr

UEFA Cup

Source: hajduk.hr

Player seasonal records

Top scorers

Source: Competitive matches

See also
1986–87 Yugoslav First League
1986–87 Yugoslav Cup

External sources
 1986–87 Yugoslav First League at rsssf.com
 1986–87 Yugoslav Cup at rsssf.com
 1986–87 UEFA Cup at rsssf.com

HNK Hajduk Split seasons
Hajduk Split